Boris Yevgenyevich Zakhava (May 24, 1896 – November 12, 1976) was a Soviet and Russian actor, theater director, pedagogue and theater theorist. People's Artist of the USSR (1967).

Biography
He was born on May 24, 1896 in Pavlograd, Russian Empire. Yevgeny Zakhava, his father, was a graduate of Moscow Imperial Cadet School and was an officer in the Imperial Russian Army. Boris, like his father, graduated the 3rd Moscow Imperial Cadet School (1913). While being a cadet, he was acting in amateur performances. In the meantime he was involved in the centennial celebration of the victory over Napoleon in 1912, in Moscow.

Zakhava studied in the acting class of Vsevolod Meyerhold (1913–1916) and acting at the Moscow Vakhtangov studio under Yevgeny Vakhtangov. Since he was being hired by Vakhtangov as an actor, Zakhava worked at his theatre (Vakhtangov Theatre) for his entire life. In 1922 he performed as a Timur in Carlo Gozzi's Turandot. Zakhava was a teaching director at the acting studio (1925) and a leading director of Vakhtangov Theatre Company. He produced and directed Maxim Gorky's dramas, Yegor Bulychev and Others (1932, 1951) and Dostegayev and Others (1933, 1934). Since 1939 he became a director of the Shchukin Theatrical School (f. Vakhtangov acting studio). In 1958 Zakhava directed William Shakespeare's Hamlet starring Mikhail Astangov in the main role.

His most notable film appearance is as Russian field marshal Mikhail Kutuzov in the Oscar-winning film War and Peace.

He died on November 12, 1976 in Moscow and was buried at Novodevichy Cemetery in Moscow.

Filmography

Awards and honors 

 Medal "For Valiant Labour in the Great Patriotic War 1941–1945"
 Medal "In Commemoration of the 800th Anniversary of Moscow"
 Order of the Badge of Honour
 Order of Friendship of Peoples
 Order of the Red Banner of Labour (May 29, 1946)
 People's Artist of the RSFSR (1946)
 Stalin Prize (1952) – for production of the play Yegor Bulychyov and Others by Maxim Gorky
 People's Artist of the USSR (1967)

Works

Notes

External links

References
 
 
 

1896 births
1976 deaths
20th-century Russian male actors
Academic staff of the Gerasimov Institute of Cinematography
People's Artists of the RSFSR
People's Artists of the USSR
Stalin Prize winners
Recipients of the Order of Friendship of Peoples
Recipients of the Order of the Red Banner of Labour
Male actors from the Russian Empire
Russian drama teachers
Russian male film actors
Russian male stage actors
Theatre directors from Moscow
Soviet drama teachers
Soviet male film actors
Soviet male stage actors
Soviet theatre directors
Burials at Novodevichy Cemetery